30 Years From Here is an American television documentary about the 30 years war on the HIV and AIDS pandemic. The documentary was directed by Josh Rosenzweig for the LGBT cable network here!. The documentary debuted on November 25, 2011.

In 2012 30 Years From Here was nominated for a Daytime Emmy Award by the National Academy of Television Arts & Sciences.

Premise
30 Years From Here examines the trials and tribulations the AIDS pandemic has created over the past 30 years. The documentary looks at how the nondiscriminatory disease has affected many lives over many years. The documentary features personal accounts from people who were there in the beginning and have seen both the sorrow over lives lost and the hope generated by advances in medical research. Activists, medical experts, and people who were on the ground describe their stories from the war on AIDS.

Cast
 Terrence McNally
 Larry Kramer
 Marjorie Hill
 Frank Spinelli
 Jerry Mitchell
 Larry Flick
 Demetre Daskalakis, M.D.
 Anthony Donovan
 David Drake
 Regan Hofmann
 John Knoebel
 Danny Logan
 Larry Mass, M.D.
 Dvorah Stohl
 Krishna Stone
 Sean Strub

References

External links

2011 documentary films
2011 films
American documentary television films
Documentary films about HIV/AIDS
Documentary films about LGBT topics
Films about viral outbreaks
Here TV original programming
HIV/AIDS in television
2011 television films
2010s English-language films
HIV/AIDS in American films
2010s American films